Ajand (also Romanized as Ājand; also known as Ājan and Ājand Chūpān Boneh) is a village in Mehravan Rural District, in the Central District of Neka County, Mazandaran Province, Iran. At the 2006 census, its population was 97, in 25 families.

References 

Populated places in Neka County